Lathyrus torreyi, also known as Torrey's peavine and redwood pea, is a perennial legume native to wooded regions of the West Coast of the United States. It ranges from as far north as Pierce County, Washington and south to Monterey, California. It sprouts bluish flowers that range from 8 to 13 millimeters in length.

References

Sources
 Beidleman, Linda H.; Kozloff, Eugene N. (2003). Plants of the San Francisco Bay Region: Mendocino to Monterey, University of California Press, .
 Niehaus, Theodore F. (1998). A Field Guide to Pacific States Wildflowers: Washington, Oregon, California and adjacent areas, HMCo Field Guides, .

External links
Jepson Manual Treatment
USDA Plants Profile
Photo gallery

torreyi
Flora of California
Flora of Oregon
Flora of Washington (state)
Flora of the Klamath Mountains
Natural history of the California Coast Ranges
Flora without expected TNC conservation status